Longdong Town is an urban town in Xiangxiang City, Hunan Province, People's Republic of China.

Cityscape
The town is divided into 29 villages and two communities, the following areas: Kenzhichang Community, Tongluowan Community, Lechang Village, Jianshi Village, Quanchong Village, Shitou Village, Jiepai Village, Hemu Village, Jiantang Village, Longdong Village, Zhongchao Village, Nanxiang Village, Qixing Village, Yaohu Village, Quanhu Village, Yamiao Village, Changtai Village, Kangjia Village, Shangyi Village, Datian Village, Yinzi Village, Xiangjiang Village, Jiyi Village, and Xiaotian Village.

References

External links

Divisions of Xiangxiang
Towns of Hunan